Medicine Lake is a town in Sheridan County, Montana, United States. The population was 244 at the 2020 census.

On July 5, 1937, Medicine Lake recorded a temperature of 117 °F (47 °C), setting the record for the highest temperature ever recorded in Montana.

On November 14, 2020, the high school football team, which co-ops with Froid, known as the RedHawks, won the 6-man State Championship. They defeated White Sulphur Springs 44-19 to finish the season 10-0. It was the first football state title for the school, which had finished 2nd in 1952, 1985 and 2000, when they were known as the Honkers.
On November 20, 2021 the undefeated RedHawks completed their quest for back to back state titles with a convincing 43-0 defeat of the Power-Dutton-Brady Titans on the road in Dutton, Montana. The win, in a season that had been dubbed “Leave no doubt” back in August, capped off a 13-0 record and extended their winning streak to 23 games.

History
Edward Stubban named this place Flandrem for his home town in Norway and established a post office and store in 1906. The town moved about 2 miles with the construction of the Great Northern Railway in 1910. They changed the name to Medicine Lake after the nearby lake the Assiniboine referred to as Bda wauka, “Medicine water.”

Geography
Medicine Lake is located at  (48.500438, -104.503079).

Climate
According to the Köppen Climate Classification system, Medicine Lake has a semi-arid climate, abbreviated "BSk" on climate maps.

Demographics

2010 census
As of the census of 2010, there were 225 people, 109 households, and 65 families residing in the town. The racial makeup of the town was 90.7% White, 0.9% African American, 4.0% Native American, and 4.4% from two or more races.

There were 109 households, of which 24.8% had children under the age of 18 living with them, 40.4% were married couples living together, 12.8% had a female householder with no husband present, 6.4% had a male householder with no wife present, and 40.4% were non-families. 38.5% of all households were made up of individuals, and 14.7% had someone living alone who was 65 years of age or older. The average household size was 2.06 and the average family size was 2.74.

The median age in the town was 48.1 years. 24.4% of residents were under the age of 18; 4.6% were between the ages of 18 and 24; 17.8% were from 25 to 44; 34.8% were from 45 to 64; and 18.7% were 65 years of age or older. The gender makeup of the town was 49.3% male and 50.7% female.

2000 census
As of the census of 2000, there were 269 people, 120 households, and 72 families residing in the town. The population density was 658.8 people per square mile (253.3/km2). There were 165 housing units at an average density of 404.1 per square mile (155.4/km2). The racial makeup of the town was 92.19% White, 3.72% Native American, 0.37% Asian, 0.37% Pacific Islander, and 3.35% from two or more races.

There were 120 households, out of which 28.3% had children under the age of 18 living with them, 50.0% were married couples living together, 6.7% had a female householder with no husband present, and 40.0% were non-families. 40.0% of all households were made up of individuals, and 15.0% had someone living alone who was 65 years of age or older. The average household size was 2.24 and the average family size was 2.97.

In the town, the population was spread out, with 26.4% under the age of 18, 7.1% from 18 to 24, 22.3% from 25 to 44, 28.3% from 45 to 64, and 16.0% who were 65 years of age or older. The median age was 41 years. For every 100 females there were 116.9 males. For every 100 females age 18 and over, there were 108.4 males.

The median income for a household in the town was $28,750, and the median income for a family was $35,694. Males had a median income of $26,000 versus $26,250 for females. The per capita income for the town was $16,405. About 7.2% of families and 7.2% of the population were below the poverty line, including 6.5% of those under the age of eighteen and 3.4% of those 65 or over.

Education
Medicine Lake School District educates students from kindergarten through 12th grade. Medicine Lake High School's team name is the Redhawks.

References

External links
 Town website

Towns in Sheridan County, Montana